Indirapuram is an established residential locality in Ghaziabad, divided into various khands such as Vaibhav Khand, Abhay Khand, Ahinsa Khand, Nyay Khand, Gyan Khand, Niti Khand and Shakti Khand. Situated along Delhi-Meerut Expressway, the locality is surrounded by prominent areas of Vasundhara, Pratap Vihar, Vaishali as well as Noida Sectors 62 & 63. Indirapuram comes under the Sahibabad assembly constituency in the Uttar Pradesh state assembly.

The locality is just 5 km away from two Blue Line metro stations of Vaishali and Noida Electronic City. The proposed Blue Line extension from Noida Electronic City to Mohan Nagar in Ghaziabad, would pass through Indirapuram strengthening metro network in the locality.

Education and healthcare centres 
Key educational institutions include DPS Indirapuram, St. Francis School, Cambridge School Indirapuram, Indirapuram Public School, Jaipuria Institute of Management and Indirapuram Institute of Higher Studies. Healthcare facilities within 5 km are Shanti Gopal Hospital, Fortis Hospital Noida, Max Super Speciality Hospital Vaishali, LYF Hospital and Amicare Hospital, Surya Physiotherapy Clinic & Home Visit Service Indirapuram.

History 
Indirapuram was founded on 28 February 1996, as a sub-city to Delhi. The black foundation stone (Kala Pathar) was inaugurated by Late Shri Moti Lal Vora, then Governor of Uttar Pradesh. The foundation stone became the starting point of today’s Kala Pathar Road. Indirapuram is named after Late Indira Gandhi, former Prime Minister of India.

The inaugration of Indirapuram Residential Project was completed at Build Tech Park and was attended by following officials of the Ghaziabad Development Authority:

 Akhand Pratap Singh, IAS (President GDA)
 R P Tyagi, IAS (Vice-President GDA)
 T P S Tyagi (Chief Engineer)
 Ved Mittal (CATP)
 Padam Singh (Secretary)

Build Tech Park is now known as the Kala Pathar Park which is located in Nyay Khand 2.

References 

Ghaziabad, Uttar Pradesh
Neighbourhoods in Ghaziabad, Uttar Pradesh